Bulgaria Dnes (Bulgaria Today), commonly Dnes, is a Bulgarian-language daily newspaper, based in Sofia.

References

External links
Official site

Daily newspapers published in Bulgaria